The short-necked worm-skink (Praeteropus brevicollis) is a species of skink found in Queensland in Australia. It has a similar resemblance to an Earthworm.

References

Praeteropus
Reptiles described in 1985
Taxa named by Allen Eddy Greer
Taxa named by Harold Cogger